Mridul Banerjee is an Indian football manager and is the current Manager cum Assistant Coach of the SC East Bengal in the Indian Super League.

Managerial career

Mohun Bagan
After having head coaching roles at Mohammedan, Green Valley and an assistant role at East Bengal Banerjee signed for Mohan Bagan on 19 October 2012 as caretaker head coach of the club until 18 November 2012 when Karim Bencherifa took over as coach of the club and Banerjee became assistant coach.

Mohammedan
At the beginning of 2015 season, Mridul Banerjee has returned to Mohammedan Sporting Club which is currently playing in Calcutta Football League(Premier Division "A") and will also take part in I-League 2nd Division later.

West Bengal football team
On 30 November 2016 it was announced that Banerjee would take charge of the West Bengal football team for their Santosh Trophy qualifying matches after being selected from a shortlist of other potential head coaches.

Statistics
Since 28 October 2012

References

Indian footballers

Living people
I-League managers
Indian football managers
Indian football coaches
Footballers from Kolkata
Association footballers not categorized by position
Year of birth missing (living people)
Mohammedan SC (Kolkata) managers
Mohun Bagan AC managers